Sijraz is a village in northern Aleppo Governorate, northwestern Syria. The Baghdad Railway passes by.

The village administratively belongs to Nahiya Azaz in Azaz District. Nearby localities include Maraanaz  to the south, and Qatma  further to the west, in the Kurd-Dagh mountains. In the 2004 census, Sijraz had a population of 735.

References

Populated places in Azaz District
Villages in Aleppo Governorate